Scott Thuman is the Chief Political Correspondent for the Sinclair Broadcast Group. He reports nightly on the White House, Capitol Hill and international affairs including terrorism and military action. Additionally, Thuman has emerged as a primary correspondent for the Sunday morning national news program, Full Measure with Sharyl Attkisson. He has filed reports for the show from Lebanon, Moscow, Ukraine, Israel and across Europe and South America. 

Thuman returned to his political reporting position in 2013 after a stint as co-anchor of "Good Morning Washington" and ABC7 "News at Noon, where he also reporter for nine years at WJLA.

Early life
Thuman was born in the Washington, DC area and grew up in South Florida. He attended Martin County High School in Stuart, Florida and Florida Southern College in Lakeland. He is a graduate of the F.B.I. Citizens' Academy at their Washington Field Office.

Career
During the 2012 presidential campaign, Thuman was the only DC-area reporter to land multiple interviews with President Obama. It was during one of these interviews that Mr. Obama made his first extensive and critical comments of Mitt Romney and his time at Bain Capital. Thuman conducted another exclusive one-on-one with President Obama on election day. Earlier in the 2012 campaign, he anchored POLITICO TV on C-SPAN. Thuman was also credited with developing new leads in the Herman Cain sex-scandal stories and was on the receiving end of Cain's now-infamous "Excuse me!" rant. In 2013, his work was extensively featured in WJLA's composite entry which won the USC Annenberg Walter Cronkite award for excellence in television political journalism.

Personal life
While working at WJLA's Good Morning Washington show, Thurman began dating fellow journalist Autria Godfrey, and married her in 2008. They eventually divorced in 2012.

References

External links 
 Station biography
 
 

American television news anchors
American television reporters and correspondents
Living people
Year of birth missing (living people)